Catharina Charlotta Swedenmarck (29 January 1744, Stockholm - 1813 Sundsbergs gård, Kyrkslätt), was a Swedish-Finnish writer and poet. Her play Dianas fest (The Feast of Diana) from 1775 is referred to as the first original work of its kind produced by a female during the Gustavian age.

The parentage of Catharina Charlotta Swedenmarck is unknown but her father is believed to have been a clerk. She married first to lieutenant Carl Johan Hastfer (d. 1771). As a widow she met with economical difficulties but was given assistance by the patronage of the courtier Baron Axel Gabriel Leijonhufvud. In 1773, she married major Carl Fredrik Toll, who was the owner of three mansions in Nyland in Finland.

Works
 Öfwer Högstsalige Hans Kongl. Maj:ts Konung Adolpf Friedrichs död. (1771) 
 Poëme, öfver Hans Kongl. Maj:ts Konung Gustaf III:s högsthugneliga kröning, d. 29 Maji 1772. (1772); 
 Skalde-Bref, I anledning af Hans Kongl. Maj:ts Kon. Gustaf III Höga Namns-Dag, d. 6 Jul. 1773.  (1773); 
 Skalde-Qwäde, Öfwer Hans Maj:ts, Konung Gustaf:s Resa til Norrske Gränsen, uti Novemb. 1772. (1774); 
 Afsked af Sommaren. Qwäde. Samlaren 1775; Dianas fest. Herdaspel uti en Act. (1775)

References 
 http://www.blf.fi/artikel.php?id=8809
  Ann Öhrberg: Fasa för all flärd, konstlan och förställning” Den ideala retorn inom 1700-talets nya offentlighet. Samlaren. 2010
 http://www.svd.se/kultur/litterar-pionjar-vard-att-uppmarksamma_155431.svd
 Carina Burman, Den finländska Sapfo. Catharina Charlotta Swedenmarcks liv och verk (Lunne böcker, 2004)

1744 births
1813 deaths
18th-century Finnish writers
18th-century Finnish women writers
18th-century Finnish poets
Finnish women poets
Finnish dramatists and playwrights
Finnish women dramatists and playwrights
Writers from Stockholm
18th-century dramatists and playwrights
18th-century Swedish poets
Swedish women poets
Swedish dramatists and playwrights
Swedish women dramatists and playwrights
18th-century Swedish women writers